Turn the Tide is the second studio album by American country music group Baillie & the Boys. It was a number 30 Country Album on Billboard charts. Its Hot Country Singles hits were, chronologically, "Long Shot" at number 5, "She Deserves You" at number 8, "(Wish I Had a) Heart of Stone" (their highest-charting single) at number 4, and "I Can't Turn the Tide" at number 9. "Safe in the Arms of Love" was later recorded by Michelle Wright in 1994 and Martina McBride in 1995, both of whom released it as a single.

Track listing

Personnel
Taken from liner notes.

Baillie & the Boys
Kathie Baillie - vocals, acoustic guitar
Michael Bonagura - vocals, electric guitar
Alan LeBoeuf - vocals, bass guitar

Additional musicians
Vince Barranco - percussion
Mike Brignardello - bass guitar
Mark Casstevens - acoustic guitar
Jerry Douglas - lap steel guitar
Sonny Garrish - pedal steel guitar
Doyle Grisham - pedal steel guitar
David Hungate - bass guitar
Shane Keister - keyboards
John Barlow Jarvis - keyboards
Paul Leim - drums, programming
Terry McMillan - harmonica, percussion
Brent Rowan - electric guitar
Gary Scruggs - electric guitar, synthesizer
Billy Joe Walker, Jr. - electric guitar

Chart performance

References

1989 albums
RCA Records albums
Baillie & the Boys albums
Albums produced by Kyle Lehning